Isabelle Bowen Henderson House and Gardens is a historic home and garden and national historic district located at Raleigh, North Carolina. The main house is a modest 19th century turreted late Victorian period frame cottage, with a Colonial Revival style studio wing and kitchen and dining porch added in 1937.  Also on the property is a contributing two car garage and apartment building (late 1930s, 1950), herb house (c. 1937), front garden (1937-1938), back garden (1937 onward), herb garden (c. 1937), and brick terrace (1937-1938).  It was the home of noted local artist Isabelle Bowen Henderson and representative of the Williamsburg Revival design movement in Raleigh.

It was listed on the National Register of Historic Places in 1989.

References 

Houses on the National Register of Historic Places in North Carolina
Historic districts on the National Register of Historic Places in North Carolina
Colonial Revival architecture in North Carolina
Victorian architecture in North Carolina
Houses completed in 1937
Houses in Raleigh, North Carolina
National Register of Historic Places in Raleigh, North Carolina